Mojtaba Roshangar (born October 31, 1981) is an Iranian footballer who currently plays for Nassaji Mazandaran in Azadegan League

Club career
Roshangar played for Shahin Bushehr from 2008 to 2011.

References

1981 births
Living people
Shahin Bushehr F.C. players
Shahr Khodro F.C. players
Iranian footballers
Persian Gulf Pro League players
Azadegan League players
Aluminium Hormozgan F.C. players
Association football goalkeepers